Dennis Høegh (born 21 February 1989) is a Danish professional footballer who plays as a midfielder.

Career
He has played 49 games and scored four goals for various Danish youth national teams, including one game for the Denmark national under-21 football team.

He has been playing at AGF since he was 12 years old, hailing from one of AGF's feeder clubs, IF Midtdjurs. He has been in teams above his age class since joining AGF. At a U16 cup he was voted the best technical player, and he has been attending trials at English giants, Chelsea and Bolton Wanderers, and at Italian giant Inter, with Chelsea touting him as one of the two best Danish player in his generation.

He made his senior debut in the Danish Cup in August 2007, and made his Superliga debut in October 2007.

References

External links
 

1989 births
Living people
Danish men's footballers
Denmark under-21 international footballers
IF Midtdjurs players
Aarhus Gymnastikforening players
Viborg FF players
Hobro IK players
FC Fredericia players
Danish Superliga players
Danish 1st Division players
Association football forwards
People from Syddjurs Municipality
Denmark youth international footballers
Sportspeople from the Central Denmark Region